Wan Tsui Estate is a public housing estate in Chai Wan, Hong Kong Island, Hong Kong located at a part of former Chai Wan Estate and opposite to MTR Chai Wan station. It now has eleven residential buildings completed between 1979 and 2001.

Yan Tsui Court and Yuet Chui Court are Home Ownership Scheme courts in Chai Wan, next to Wan Tsui Estate. They have two residential blocks (built in 1983) and one residential block (built in 1999) respectively.

Houses

Wan Tsui Estate

Yan Tsui Court

Yuet Chui Court

Demographics
According to the 2016 by-census, Wan Tsui Estate had a population of 10,109. The median age was 45.6 and the majority of residents (97.4 per cent) were of Chinese ethnicity. The average household size was 2.8 people. The median monthly household income of all households (i.e. including both economically active and inactive households) was HK$22,490.

Politics
Wan Tsui Estate, Yan Tsui Court and Yuet Chui Court are located in Wan Tsui constituency of the Eastern District Council. It was formerly represented by Ng Cheuk-ip, who was elected in the 2019 elections until July 2021.

Education
Wan Tsui Estate is in Primary One Admission (POA) School Net 16. Within the school net are multiple aided schools (operated independently but funded with government money) and two government schools: Shau Kei Wan Government Primary School and Aldrich Bay Government Primary School.

See also

Public housing estates in Chai Wan and Siu Sai Wan

References

Chai Wan
Public housing estates in Hong Kong
Residential buildings completed in 1979
Residential buildings completed in 1980
Residential buildings completed in 1981
Residential buildings completed in 2001